Hong Kong Adventist Hospital – Tsuen Wan, previously known as Tsuen Wan Adventist Hospital, is one of two Seventh-day Adventist hospitals in Hong Kong, the other being Hong Kong Adventist Hospital – Stubbs Road.

It is a private sector hospital, and is located in the New Territories. It provides a very wide range of services.

Tsuen Wan Adventist Hospital is subject to international healthcare accreditation - for many years it has been surveyed and accredited by the UK's QHA Trent Accreditation, and more recently it has also been assessed by Joint Commission International from the US, although as of 2010 not any more.

History
In 1960, Dr. Harry Willis Miller was asked by the Seventh-day Adventist Church to establish a hospital in Hong Kong. Now Dr. Miller was no stranger to local Chinese. In 1925, he established the Shanghai Sanitarium and Hospital in China, a country he first visited in 1903. 
 
Mr. Tong Ping Yuen, a friend of Dr. Miller and the owner of the South Seas Textile Factory, donated a floor. With the help of the Medical and Health Department, a land grant was secured from the Government. The Jockey Club provided funds for the ground floor. Equipment was funded by the American Government.

The Hospital was officially opened on 20 May 1964. Owing to a shortage of funds, it was five years later, in June 1970, that the hospital building was completed with the generous donation from the American Government.

See also

 List of Seventh-day Adventist hospitals
 List of Christian hospitals in China
 List of hospitals in Hong Kong

References

External links

 Tsuen Wan Adventist Hospital, Hong Kong - web site

Hospital buildings completed in 1964
Hospitals in Hong Kong
Hospitals affiliated with the Seventh-day Adventist Church